Kinkala is a town located in southeastern Republic of the Congo. It is the capital city of Kinkala District and the Pool Region.

Notable people
 

Abel Thauley-Ganga (born 1920), Congolese trade unionist and politician

References

 
Pool Department
Populated places in the Republic of the Congo